The Price Daniel Unit is a state prison for men located in unincorporated Scurry County, Texas, near Snyder, owned by operated by the Texas Department of Criminal Justice.  This facility was opened in August 1989, and a maximum capacity of 1384 male inmates held at various security levels.

References

Prisons in Texas
Buildings and structures in Scurry County, Texas
1989 establishments in Texas